Wenzhou people or Wenzhounese people is a subgroup of Oujiang Wu Chinese speaking peoples, who live primarily in Wenzhou, Zhejiang province. Wenzhou people are known for their business and money-making skills. The area also has a large diaspora population in Europe and the United States, with a reputation for being enterprising natives who start restaurants, retail and wholesale businesses in their adopted countries. About two-thirds of the overseas community is in Europe. Wenzhounese people have also made notable contributions to mathematics and technology.

History
Wenzhou was the home territory of the Dong'ou Kingdom, which have been conquered by the Minyue Kingdom and later by the Han dynasty.

The majority of people in Wenzhou are descendants of immigrants and about 80% came from Fujian province. From the Tang, Song to Ming and Qing dynasties, a great number of families in Fujian province immigrated to Wenzhou with all their family members.

Culture

Language
Wenzhou natives speak a unique form of Wu Chinese called Wenzhou dialect. However, geographic isolation and an admixture of Southern Min Chinese speakers from nearby Fujian Province, have caused Wenzhou's spoken language to evolve into a dialect that is notable for its highly divergent phonology. As a result, even people from other regions of Zhejiang and Fujian both have trouble understanding Wenzhounese. The Taizhou dialect, located directly to the north, has little to no mutual intelligibility with Wenzhou. Many Wenzhou natives also speak a Southern Min dialect called Zhenan Min.

The Wenzhou dialect preserves a large amount of vocabulary of classical Chinese lost in most other Chinese dialects, earning itself the nickname "the living fossil", and has distinct grammatical differences from Mandarin.

Due to its high degree of eccentricity and difficulty for non-locals to understand, the language is reputed to have been used during the Second Sino-Japanese War during wartime communication as code talkers and in Sino-Vietnamese War for programming military code.

Opera
Nanxi is a form of Chinese opera developed in Wenzhou, which is the earliest form of traditional Chinese Opera in the history of China.

Philosophy
Wenzhou was home to the Yongjia School of thought, which emphasized pragmatism and commerce. This philosophy is thought to have been a forerunner to modern capitalism in the region.

People of Excellence and Land of Wisdom
There is a popular saying in China that reflects the status of the city of Wenzhou related to the Fengshui of Wenzhou which is "People of Excellence and Land of Wisdom"(人傑地靈), as the local Wenzhounese people are usually described in China as the people of excellence and the city of Wenzhou is usually praised as the city of wisdom.

Birthplace of China's private economy
In the early days of economic reforms, local Wenzhounese took the lead in China in developing a commodity economy, household industries and specialized markets. Many thousands of people and families were engaged in household manufacturing to develop individual and private economy (private enterprise). Up till now, Wenzhou has a total of 240,000 individually owned commercial and industrial units and 130,000 private enterprises of which 180 are group companies, 4 among China's top 500 enterprises and 36 among national 500 top private enterprises. There are 27 national production bases such as "China’s Shoes Capital" and "China’s Capital of Electrical Equipment", China's 40 famous trademarks and China's famous-brand products and 67 national inspection-exempt products in the city. The development of private economy in Wenzhou has created the "Wenzhou Economic Model", which inspires the modernization drive in China.

Education
, 650,300 people in Wenzhou hold a college degree; 1,150,400 people hold a high school degree; 3,344,400 people hold a middle school degree; 2,679,900 people hold an elementary school degree. In every 100,000 people in Wenzhou, 7128 people hold a college degree; 12611 people hold a high school degree; 36663 people hold a middle school degree and 29379 people hold an elementary school degree. The population of illiterate people in Wenzhou is 645,100, which is 7.07% of its whole population.

Regions

Wenzhou

At the time of the 2010 Chinese census, 3,039,500 people lived in Wenzhou's city proper; the area under its jurisdiction (which includes two satellite cities and six counties) held a population of 9,122,100 of which 31.16% are non-local residents from outside of Wenzhou.

Rest of mainland China
There are around 1.7 million Wenzhounese people living in other parts of the country. In major cities such as Beijing or Shanghai there are "Zhejiang villages", enclaves where people from Wenzhou reside and do business.

Italy
In 2010, an analysis conducted by the CESNUR and the University of Turin on the 4,000-strong Chinese community of Turin showed that at that time, 48% of this community was women and 30%, minors. Most of the Chinese in Italy—and virtually all of the Turin community—hail from the southeastern Chinese province of Zhejiang, primarily the city of Wenzhou. The community in Turin is younger than other Chinese settlements in Italy, and for this reason it depends as a branch of the community of Milan. Approximately 70% of the Chinese in Turin work in restaurant activity, and more than 20% work in commercial activity.

Prato, Tuscany has the largest concentration of Chinese people in Italy, and all of Europe. It has the second largest population of Chinese people overall in Italy, after Milan.

The Netherlands
The Netherlands currently has the third largest population of Wenzhounese in Europe.

Spain
About 70% of the Chinese people in Spain are from Wenzhou or Qingtian.

United States
Wenzhou people in the United States are mostly concentrated on the East Coast, particularly around the New York City metropolitan area. Many Wenzhou people are owners of Chinese restaurants. They are the second largest group of Chinese undocumented immigrants in the United States, after Fuzhounese people. The total Wenzhou population in the US was estimated to be around 250,000 in 2016.

Japan
Japan was the destination for many Wenzhounese migrants in the beginning of the 20th century, however many of them returned following the rise of anti-foreign sentiment and ultimately the outbreak of the second Sino-Japanese War.

Notable Wenzhounese people

Mathematicians
 
Sun Yirang 孫诒让 (1848–1908), pioneer of decipherment of oracle bone script, founder of the first mathematical academy in the history of China, mentor of Huang Qingcheng
Huang Qingcheng 黄庆澄 (1863–1904), uncle of Jiang Lifu, founder of the first periodical of mathematics in the history of China, student of Sun Yirang
Jiang Lifu 姜立夫 (1890–1978), father of mathematics in modern China, first president of Academia Sinica of Mathematics, mentor of Su Buqing, Shiing-Shen Chern, Hua Luogeng, father of Jiang Boju, nephew and student of Huang Qingcheng
Su Buqing 苏步青 (1902–2003), mathematician, president and honorary president of Fudan University, honorary chairman of the Chinese Mathematical Society, first geometer in the Orient, renowned as "King of Math" in China, student of Jiang Lifu
Li Ruifu 李锐夫(1903–1987), prominent mathematician and astronomer, author of Solar System, former vice president of Shanghai Mathematical Society and Shanghai Astronomical Society
Shu Shien-Siu 徐賢修 (1912—2002), former prime minister of Ministry of Science and Technology of Republic of China, president of National Tsing Hua University, father of Hsinchu Science and Industrial Park, renowned as the father of high-tech industry in Taiwan
Xiang Fuchen 项黼宸 (1916–1990), former chair of the Department of Mathematics at National Taiwan University, former president of Academia Sinica of Mathematics
Bai Zhengguo 白正國 (1916–2015), one of the pioneers of geometry in China, student of Su Buqing, mentor of Gu Chaohao
Chung Tao Yang 杨忠道 (1923–2005), chair of the Department of Mathematics at University of Pennsylvania from 1978 to 1983, student of Su Buqing
Zhang Mingyong 张鸣镛 (1926–1986), vice chair of Department of Mathematics at Xiamen University, mentor of Chen Jingrun, student of Su Buqing
Gu Chaohao 谷超豪 (1926–2012), vice president of Fudan University, president of University of Science and Technology of China, student of Su Buqing, Bai Zhengguo
Wu-Chung Hsiang 项武忠 (1935–), chair of the Department of Mathematics at Princeton University from 1982 to 1985, son of Xiang Changquan
Wu-Yi Hsiang 项武义 (1937–), prominent mathematician in geometry and topology, professor emeritus at University of California, Berkeley, one of the provers of Kepler Conjecture
Jiang Boju 姜伯驹 (1937–), first president of School of Mathematical Sciences at Peking University, former chairman of Beijing Mathematical Society, son of Jiang Lifu
Li Bingyi 李秉彝 (1938–), former president of Southeast Asian Mathematical Society, former vice president of International Commission on Mathematical Instruction
Lu Shanzhen 陆善镇 (1939–), prominent mathematician, president of Beijing Normal University, former professor at Washington University in St. Louis
Li Banghe 李邦河 (1942–), prominent mathematician in differential topology, low-dimension topology and invariable quantum, solver of Minimal Genus Problem
T. Tony Cai 蔡天文 (1967–), 2008 COPSS Presidents' Award winner, Dorothy Silberberg professor at Wharton School of the University of Pennsylvania

Champions of board games
Bao Yizhong 鲍一中 (1500–1566), prominent Ming dynasty player of Go
Xie Xiaxun 谢侠逊 (1887–1987), father of Chinese chess, renowned as the "Supreme Commander of Chess" and "King of Chess" in China
Ye Rongguang 叶荣光 (1963–), first ever grandmaster of chess in the history of China
Zhu Chen 诸宸 (1976–), chess grandmaster and women's world champion
Ding Liren 丁立人 (1992–), chess grandmaster, ranked first in China and third in the world (as of April 2019)

Academicians
Wang Xizhi 王羲之 (303–361), sage of Chinese calligraphy, former governor of Yongjia
Xie Lingyun (Duke of Kangle) 谢灵运 (385–433), poet, founder of landscape poetry in China
Ye Shi 叶适 (1150–1223), philosopher, most important figure of the neo-Confucianism Yongjia School
Wu Xianwen 伍献文 (1900–1985), one of the pioneers of Ichthyology and Nematology in China
Fang Jiekan 方介堪 (1901–1987), prominent calligrapher, former honorary chairman of Chinese Calligraphers Association
Cheng Man-ch'ing (Zheng Manqing) 郑曼青 (1902–1975), t'ai chi ch'uan master, calligrapher, painter, poet, doctor of Chinese medicine, called the "Master of Five Excellences"
Xia Nai 夏鼐 (1910–1985), archaeologist, pioneer of archaeology in modern China, one of the most honored scholars in archaeology
Qi Jun 琦君 (1917–2006), author, best-selling female author of Taiwan, one of the most significant female authors in the history of China
Chen Cheng-siang (Chen Zhengxiang) 陈正祥 (1922–2003), first prominent geographer in the history of China, one of the most prominent geographers in the world, renowned as the Alexander von Humboldt of the Orient
Chen Guangzhong 陈光中 (1930–), jurist, renowned as the father of Criminal procedure of China
Frank Shu 徐遐生 (1943–), chair of astronomy department of University of California, Berkeley from 1984 to 1988, former president of American Astronomical Society, president of National Tsing Hua University, son of Shu Shien-Siu
Hsiao Cheng 萧政 (1943–), editor and member of executive council of Journal of Econometrics
Jin Henghui 金恒炜 (1944–), journalist, author, pundit, former vice president of Taiwan Society
Shen Zhixun 沈志勋 (1962–), one of the pioneers in materials physics, winner of E.O. Lawrence Award, Advisor for Science and Technology of SLAC National Accelerator Laboratory
Wu Zhaohui 吴朝晖 (1966–), educator, president of Zhejiang University

Politicians
Liu Ji 刘基 (1311–1375), founding father of Ming dynasty alongside founding emperor Zhu Yuanzhang, renowned as the Divine Chinese Nostradamus, author of Shaobing Song
Huang Huai 黃淮 (1367–1449), served on the Grand Secretariat of the Ming dynasty
Ni Wenya 倪文亚(1902–2006), former president of the Legislative Yuan of the Republic of China
Jean Ping 让平 (1942–), former Chairperson of the Commission of the African Union, former President of the United Nations General Assembly, son of Wenzhounese businessman Cheng Zhiping
Dai Ren 戴任 (1862–1937), revolutionist of democracy in China, prominent politician during Republic of China, friend and partner of Sun Yat-sen 
Wu Qidi 吴启迪 (1947–), educator, former vice prime minister of Ministry of Education of the People's Republic of China, former president of Tongji University, first collegiate president appointed through election in the history of China
Xiang Changquan 项昌权 (1903–2000), former vice president of the Department of Civil Affairs for the Republic of China, former mayor of Taipei, father of Wu-Chung Hsiang
Zhang Cong (statesman) 张璁 (1475–1539), Ming dynasty politician

Economy
Sheun Mingling 林训明 (1921–), billionaire, founder of Evora SA, one of the world's biggest nonwoven manufacturer, biggest aluminum can manufacturer in Brazil 
Nina Wang 龚如心 (1937–2007), billionaire, businesswoman, former Asia and Hong Kong's richest woman, founder of Nina Tower, wife of Teddy Wang
Kung Yan-sum 龚仁心 (1942–), billionaire, brother of Nina Wang, chairman of Chinachem Group, one of the biggest property developers in Hong Kong
Jason Chang 张虔生 (1944–), billionaire, founder and president of ASE Group, the world's largest provider of independent semiconductor manufacturing services 
Huang Jiannan 黃建南 (1945–), former chief fundraiser for Democratic National Committee in 1996
Lin Jianhai 林建海(1955–), economist, secretary-general of International Monetary Fund
Nita Ing (Yin Qi) 殷琪 (1955–), business magnate, billionaire, first lady of construction business in Taiwan, president of Continental Engineering Corporation
James Chu 朱家良 (1957–), founder and president of Viewsonic, world's first-ever manufacturer of Smart Display 
Wu Xiaohui 吴小晖 (1966–), owner of Waldorf Astoria New York, founder and CEO of China's second biggest insurance group, Anbang Insurance Group

Others
Yongjia Xuanjue 永嘉玄觉 (655–713), Chán master, Tiantai Buddhist monk, author of the Song of Enlightenment
Miu Tianrui 缪天瑞(1908–2009), pioneer of Musical temperament in China, "father of Music journalism" in China 
Zeng Liansong 曾联松 (1917–1999), creator of Flag of the People's Republic of China
Nan Huai-Chin 南怀瑾 (1918–2012), spiritual teacher of contemporary China, most important figure of Chinese Buddhism in modern China
Wang Zhaofan 王昭藩 (1931–), architect, one of the designers along with Minoru Yamasaki of original World Trade Center 
Feng Zhenghu 冯正虎 (1954–), economist, activist, reputed as the "prominent human rights defender" in China
Zhou Yun (1978–) 周韵, main actress in Let the Bullets Fly and The Assassin
Tang Wei 汤唯 (1982–), actress, main actress in Lust, Caution
Ho-Pin Tung 董荷斌 (1982–), first Formula 1 racer in the history of China
Zhu Qinan 朱启南 (1984–), Games of the XXVIII Olympiad Gold Medalist in sport shooting
Sui He (1989–) 何穗, supermodel, first Asian face of Shiseido, first Asian model to open a Ralph Lauren runway show, Victoria's Secret fashion model
Dong Sicheng (1997–) 董思成, member of Korean idol group NCT
Estelle Chen (Chen Yu) (1998–) 陈瑜, only Asian model in Dior Haute Couture 2015/2016
Huang Minghao (Justin Huang) (2002–) 黄明昊, singer, main piece in Produce 101

References

Subgroups of the Han Chinese
Wenzhou